Not Forgotten may refer to:

 Not Forgotten (film), a 2009 American independent thriller
 Not Forgotten (novel), an original novel based on the U.S. television series Angel
 "Not Forgotten" (song), the first single released by the electronic group Leftfield
 Not Forgotten (TV series), a British television documentary series made by Wall to Wall for Channel 4